The Association of College Honor Societies (ACHS) is a predominantly American, voluntary association that serves a number of functions with respect to national collegiate and post-graduate honor societies. ACHS coordinates member organizations, facilitates communications between them, and provides both scholarships and an outlet for publication to members through its member organizations. ACHS member societies undergo periodic audits to validate their adherence to ACHS standards and their qualification for membership and ACHS certification.

ACHS was formed in 1925 to create a network of affiliated societies and promote high standards for scholarship and leadership on campus. The intention of the founding societies was to establish and maintain desirable standards for groups wishing to call themselves honor societies.  These standards include criteria for membership, governance and chapter operation. Four organizations were represented at a preliminary meeting held on October 2, 1925. They were Alpha Omega Alpha, the Order of the Coif, Phi Beta Kappa, and Sigma Xi. The six founding organizations on December 30, 1925, were Alpha Omega Alpha, the Order of the Coif, Phi Beta Kappa, Phi Kappa Phi, Sigma Xi and  Tau Beta Pi.

While ACHS certifies each of its members as legitimate, credible organizations, not all legitimate honor societies apply for membership in ACHS. 
The honor society standards set by the Association of College Honor Societies are recognized by the U.S. government's Office of Personnel Management for entry into government employment at GS-7 Level: "Applicants can be considered eligible based on membership in one of the national scholastic honor societies listed... by the Association of College Honor Societies. Agencies considering eligibility based on any society not included in the following list must ensure that the honor society meets the minimum requirements of the Association of College Honor Societies."

List of member organizations

69 organizations are affiliated with the ACHS:

Notes

Former members
While the Association of College Honor Societies, with sixty-nine members as of 2022, remains the largest trade association of honor societies, some former members have resigned ACHS membership to operate independently. Of these, several have either merged into successor groups which remain part of the ACHS, or have gone dormant.

Recently, four of the oldest independent honor societies, including three of the original six founding members of the ACHS, have formed a new coordinating organization called the Honor Society Caucus.

Honor Society Caucus

Other former, merged or dormant members of the ACHS

Notes

See also
 Honor society

References

External links
 Association of College Honor Societies website
 Council for the Advancement of Standards in Higher Education - The Role of College Honor Societies, CAS Standards Contextual Statement
 Qualifying for U.S. Government GS-7 under Superior Academic Achievement through Honor Society Membership
 Searchable database of ACHS member society chapters

 
University organizations
1925 establishments in the United States
Student organizations established in 1925